Newberry is a surname.

The Newbery Medal is a literary award for children's books.

The Newberry Library is a private research library in Chicago. 

Newberry may also refer to some places in the United States:
 Newberry, Florida
 Newberry High School (Florida)
 Newberry, Indiana
 Newberry, Michigan
 Newberry, South Carolina
 Newberry College
 Newberry Township, York County, Pennsylvania
 Newberry County, South Carolina
 Newberry National Volcanic Monument
 Newberry Crater

See also
 Newbery (disambiguation)
 Newbury (disambiguation)